Stephanus Marthinus 'Stoof' Bezuidenhout (born 10 May 1986 in Vereeniging, South Africa) is a South African rugby union player, who played with the  from 2011 to 2015. His regular position is tighthead prop.

Career

Varsity Cup

Bezuidenhout played for Potchefstroom-based university side  in the Varsity Cup competition in 2009, 2010 and 2011.

Leopards

He was also a regular for the side in the 2011 Currie Cup Premier Division, being named in the run-on side in ten of their fourteen matches.

He made fourteen appearances for them in the 2012 Currie Cup First Division to help them finish in fourth place.

References

South African rugby union players
Living people
1986 births
People from Vereeniging
Rugby union props
Leopards (rugby union) players
Sportspeople from Gauteng